The Repedea is a left tributary of the river Vișeu in Romania. It discharges into the Vișeu in Borșa.

References

Rivers of Romania
Rivers of Maramureș County